The Naicatchewenin First Nation, also known as the Anishinaabeg of Nagaajiwanaang and formerly known as Northwest Bay First Nation, inhabited a region in Ontario that was cited in the Northwest Angle Treaty of 1873, also known as Treaty 3.

Name
In the Ojibwe language, Nagaajiwanaang mean "At the place where the current is obstructed."

Demographics
As of February 2009, the First Nation had a registered population of 375 people, of whom 257 people live within their own Reserve.

Reserves
The Reserves of Nagaajiwanaang include:

  Rainy Lake Indian Reserve No. 17A, surveyed in 1878, serves as their main land base, containing the Naicatchewenin Community.
  Rainy Lake Indian Reserve No. 17B
  Agency Indian Reserve No. 1, which is shared with three other First Nations.

Governance
The First Nation elect their leaders for their council under the Indian Act Electoral System, consisting of a chief and three councillors. The current council consists of Chief Wayne Smith and Councillors Charles Smith, Donald Smith and Orville Smith. Their two-year term that began on January 6, 2008.

The First Nation is a member of the Pwi-Di-Goo-Zing Ne-Yaa-Zhing Advisory Services, a regional Chiefs Council, as well as being a member of the Grand Council of Treaty 3, a Tribal Political Organization serving many of the First Nations in northwest Ontario and southeast Manitoba.

History
Seven Generations Education Institute (SGEI) is an Aboriginal-owned and controlled post-secondary institution co-founded by the ten bands in the Rainy Lake Tribal area in 1985. The ten bands are: Big Grassy, Big Island, Couchiching, Lac La Croix, Naicatchewenin, Nigigoonsiminikaaning, Ojibways of Onigaming, Rainy River, Seine River and Mitaanjigaming. Each of the ten bands appointed one member to a Board of Directors of Seven Generations Education Institute, which functions with the leadership of the Executive Director.

Government Programs
 Band Administration
 Education
 Health Services
 Brighter Futures
 Building Healthy Communities
 Aboriginal Healing and Wellness
 Social Services
 Family Services
 Housing
 Economic Development
 Post Secondary Education
 Operations and Maintenance
 Naicatchewenin Development Corporation
 Community Services
 Fire Protection
 Emergency First Response Team
 Emergency Preparedness - Community Emergency Control Group
 Roads and Bridges
 Central Water Supply
 Central Sewage System
 School Bussing
 Forestry
 Recreation Services
 Carpentry

External links
 Naicatchewenin First Nation Website
 INAC Profile

First Nations in Ontario